Pik Tandykul (Tandy Köl) is a mountain in the Alay Mountains of Central Asia.

See also
List of Ultras of Central Asia

References

Mountains of Kyrgyzstan
Mountains of Tajikistan
International mountains of Asia
Kyrgyzstan–Tajikistan border
Five-thousanders of the Tian Shan